Diners Club International (DCI), founded as Diners Club, is a charge card company owned by Discover Financial Services. Formed in 1950 by Frank X. McNamara, Ralph Schneider, Matty Simmons, and Alfred S. Bloomingdale, it was the first independent payment card company in the world, successfully establishing  the financial service of issuing travel and entertainment (T&E) credit cards as a viable business. Diners Club International and its franchises serve individuals from around the world with operations in 59 countries.

History 

The idea for Diners Club was conceived at the Majors Cabin Grill restaurant in New York City in 1949. Diners Club cofounder Frank McNamara was dining with clients and realized he had left his wallet in another suit. His wife paid the bill, and McNamara thought of a multipurpose charge card as a way to avoid similar embarrassments in the future. He discussed the idea with the restaurant owner at the table, and the following day with his lawyer Ralph Schneider and friend Alfred Bloomingdale.

McNamara returned to the same restaurant the following February, in 1950, and paid for his meal using a cardboard charge card and a signature. The story became well-known. Diners Club official history refers to this meal as "The First Supper", and is credited by historians as the beginnings of contemporary credit. Various versions of the story differ about whether it was a lunch or dinner at which McNamara forgot his wallet, and whether the bill was paid on loan or McNamara waited for his wife to drive his wallet to him. Some journalists later credited Alfred Bloomingdale with the idea for Diners Club.

McNamara and his attorney, Ralph Schneider, founded Diners Club International on February 8, 1950, with $1.5 million in initial capital. Alfred Bloomingdale joined briefly, then started a competing venture in California before merging his California-based Dine and Sign with Diners Club. McNamara's original conception was to make a card that could be used as a means of payment in restaurants around New York City; however, he later expanded its usage to other establishments as well including hotels, car rentals, and flower shops. The company started building its customer base by offering their cards to prominent businessmen. Shortly afterward, Matty Simmons, the company's first press agent, started advertising the card in newspapers, magazines, and by sending personal mail to potential customers. Diners Club International was named for being a "club of diners" that would allow patrons to settle their bill at the end of each month through their credit account. When the card was first introduced, Diners Club listed 27 participating restaurants, and 200 of the founders' friends and acquaintances used it.

Diners Club had 20,000 members by the end of 1950 and 42,000 by the end of 1951. At the time, the company was charging participating establishments seven percent and billed cardholders $5 a year. In 1952, McNamara sold his interest in Diners Club to his partners for $200,000. The first plastic Diners Club card was introduced in 1961; by the mid-1960s, Diners Club had 1.3 million cardholders.

Towards the end of the 1960s, Diners Club faced competition from banks that issued revolving credit cards through Bank of America's BankAmericard (later changed its name to Visa), and Interbank Master Charge (renamed to MasterCard). Starting in 1968, the American Oil Company, or Amoco, also launched its own co-branded Diners Club cards called American Torch Club (later renamed Amoco Torch Club), and Sun Oil Company issued its version called Sun Diners Club Card starting in 1977.

In 1981, Citibank, a unit of Citigroup, bought Diners Club International, including the franchisor that holds rights to the Diners Club trademark. Despite this, a majority of the franchises abroad remain independently owned.

In April 2008, Discover Financial and Citigroup announced that Discover was purchasing the Diners Club International network from Citigroup for $165 million. In May 2008, the Federal Trade Commission approved the transaction and it was finalized on July 1, 2008.

In 2023, the Diners Club Singaporean franchise (known as DCS Card Centre) issued the first UnionPay-branded Diners Club card, known as the DCS Ultimate Platinum Card.

Franchising

International franchise
In a transaction completed July 1, 2008, Discover Financial Services purchased Diners Club International from Citibank for $165 million. The deal was announced in April 2008 and approved by the U.S. government in May 2008. By merging the North American Discover Network with the international Diners Club Network, Discover created a global payment processing system. Discover Bank has no plans to issue Diners Club-branded cards, which continue to be issued by Diners Club International licensees.

In 2011, Discover started incorporating its logo on Diners Club International cards. Several payment processors, like PayPal, can process only new Diners Club International cards, which include the Discover logo, as well as BMO's Diners Club-branded Mastercards issued in North America.

Argentina
In Argentina, Citibank entered into an agreement to transfer its rights and obligations with Banco Comafi. Since December 16, 2013,  Banco Comafi S.A. manage the Diners Club credit card business in Argentina; Thus, Comafi will be the new exclusive representative and, therefore, the only issuer of the card.

Australia
In July 1974 Ansett Transport Industries purchased a 50% shareholding in the Australian franchise. In January 1999 Ansett sold its shareholding to Citigroup.

On June 1, 2022, National Australia Bank bought Citigroup's Consumer Banking business in Australia, including the Australian branch of Diners Club.
The Diners Club Corporate Card, Citi Mastercard Corporate Executive Companion Card, Diners Club Business Card and the Citi Mastercard Business Companion Card previously marketed under the Citibank brand is now currently marketed under the National Australia Bank (NAB) brand as a result of the above mentioned acquisition.

Brazil 

On November 21, 2018, it was announced that Diners Club International and Brazilian card association Elo were extending their partnership: they launched Elo Diners Club International Cards in Brazil. The cards run via the Discover Global Network, and are accepted at 42 million merchant locations and 2 million ATMs in over 190 countries and territories.

China and Hong Kong 

In September 2017, Diners Club International signed a deal with Allinpay, a Chinese payment provider, to be the exclusive carrier of all the cards that are part of the Discover Global Network. Apart from that, Allinpay set to increase the card acceptance in Hong Kong, especially by "travel oriented merchants".

India 
Diners Club was the first to introduce credit cards in India. Kali Mody is credited with opening the first Diners franchise in 1961, which started an invitation-only credit card issuance. Its cards have been offered by Citi Bank, followed by HDFC Bank which took over in 2011.

In 2021, the Reserve Bank of India barred the company (along with American Express) from issuing new cards for failing to follow norms about storing data within the country. The ban was lifted later in the year after it complied with the RBI guidelines.

Kazakhstan 

In September 2016, Kazkommertsbank became the official Diners Club card issuer in Kazakhstan. In a statement, Managing Director of Kazkommertsbank, Nurlan Zhagiparov said, "Our collaboration with Diners Club is another step toward the integration of Kazakhstan into the global economy, which increases the tourism potential in our country."

Nordic franchise
In the Nordic countries, the franchisee was SEB Kort AB, a subsidiary of the Swedish bank Skandinaviska Enskilda Banken. The franchisee closed the service May 31, 2019, citing increased competition and regulatory pressure in the payment card market, and the card is no longer issued in the Nordic countries.

North American franchise

MasterCard alliance
In 2004, Diners Club announced an agreement with Mastercard. Since 2004, all Diners Club cards issued in the United States and Canada (by Citibank until 2009, by BMO since) feature a Mastercard logo and 16-digit account number on the front and can be used wherever Mastercards are accepted. These cards are processed through the Mastercard network. Today's Diners Club and Carte Blanche cards in North America, is basically a Diners Club-branded Mastercard.

Initially, cards from other countries continued to bear a 14-digit account number on the front, with the Mastercard logo on the back. However, since the takeover of Diners Club International by Discover Financial Services, international cards have had the Discover logo on the back and the Diners Club International network is part of the Discover network. Since then, the only connection between Diners Club in North America and Diners Club International is BMO's continuous licensed use of the Diners Club brands, including Carte Blanche, on Mastercard credit cards.

Carte Blanche
Carte Blanche began in 1958 when the Hilton Hotels travel & entertainment card was renamed. Hilton sold Carte Blanche to First National City Bank in 1966. Regulatory challenges forced First National City Bank to sell Carte Blanche to Avco in 1968. In 1978, Citicorp (parent company of First National City Bank which was renamed Citibank) reacquired Carte Blanche without regulatory opposition. The 1960s- and 1970s-era Carte Blanche cards were considered more prestigious worldwide than their competition, the American Express and Diners Club cards, though its small cardmember base hindered its success. In 1981, Citicorp acquired the Diners Club card, and by the mid-1990s the Carte Blanche card was being phased out in favor of Diners Club. Parent company Citigroup was formed in 1998 with the merger of Citicorp and the Travelers Group. Citigroup issued a premium Diners Club card in 2000, naming it the Diners Club Carte Blanche card. It was an upper-level charge card on par with the American Express Platinum Card.

The Carte Blanche card in North America, now a branded Mastercard issued by BMO under its Diners Club International brand license, carried a US$300 annual fee as of April 2015 and offers an extensive menu of perks.

enRoute

Diners Club expanded its customer base in Canada by acquiring the enRoute credit card from Air Canada in 1992. It marketed the card under the combined name for a period of time as the "Diners Club/enRoute Card". The enRoute business was valued at over $300 million at the time of acquisition.

Acquisition by BMO
In November 2009, Citibank announced that Diners Club International's North American franchise had been sold to Bank of Montreal (BMO). The deal gives BMO exclusive rights to issue Diners cards in the U.S. and Canada. At the time, BMO said the Diners Club fits well with its existing commercial card business, adding that, commercial cards are one of the fastest-growing segments in the credit card business.

Philippines 

In June 2016, Security Bank through its credit card division SB Cards Corporation (formerly Security Diners International Corporation) sold Diners Club's exclusive rights in the Philippines to its rival, BDO Unibank and in October of the same year, Diners Club International announced that they signed a deal with BDO Unibank to become the exclusive provider of the Diners Club in the Philippines.

Russia
In December 2010, Russian Standard Bank and Diners Club International entered into an agreement for settlement of transactions in Russia. Under the agreement, Russian Standard Bank will process settlement transactions of other banks acting as acquirers of Diners Club in Russia.

On March 8, 2022, Discover/Diners Club suspended all operations in Russia.

Slovenian franchise
In 2013, Tomaž Lovše, who owned Diners Club Slovenia, was one of three people investigated in Slovenia regarding unpaid debts that his franchise owed to merchants. In May, the Central Bank of Slovenia revoked Diners Club Slovenia's license for payment services, which meant 80,000 local members could not use their card. Diners Club International transferred the franchise to a subsidiary of Austria's Erste Bank group, Erste Card Club, and agreed to repay the franchise's debt to merchants. An Erste press release in August 2013 stated that Diners Club services were once again available in Slovenia.

South East Asia 

In December 2016, Diners Club International and 2C2P, announced in a statement that the latter is a global provider of cards running on Discover Global Network and that it will increase the number of merchants who use the card in the region of South East Asia.

Swiss, Austrian and German franchise
In a transaction that closed on August 6, 2010, Citibank sold the Swiss and German franchises to a private investment group headed by Anthony J. Helbling. The German Diners Club cards are issued by the Austrian DC Bank AG, which now issues the cards for Austria and Germany.

United Arab Emirates 
Diners Club UAE, Egypt, Lebanon and Jordan is owned and operated by Network International subsidiary of Emirates Bank.

United Kingdom and Ireland franchise
On August 7, 2012, Citigroup announced the sale of its Diners Club franchise in the United Kingdom and Ireland to Affiniture Cards, a private investor group.

Vietnam 

On January 23, 2018, it was announced that Vietinbank had entered into a partnership with Diners Club International to be the exclusive issuer of Diners Club cards (both standard and contactless) in Vietnam.

Business Development and Contracts

Australian Government Travel Services 
In 2012 as part of a financial reform program started the previous year to address Government spending by public servants, the Australian Government appointed Diners Club as the sole provider of credit cards for Government travel services. Under the arrangement, Diners Club provided Diners Club charge cards as Travel Cards to Public Servants (i.e Defence Travel Card). Diners Club was also to supply an updated Expense Management System (EMS), to Government agencies without one, or who wanted to upgrade their existing system. The new EMS would provide "timely, accurate and reliable” transactional data feeds for all card expenditure to agency finance or expense systems, allowing them to understand the nature of their travel expenditure, due to the “comprehensive data” that would be provided through the system from travel supplies. Diners Club now provides Diners Club Travel Cards to Government Public Servants with a companion Mastercard to increase the number of locations that accept the card, to reduce cash advance withdrawals of travels allowances.

In popular culture
In 1963, the film The Man from the Diners' Club was released, and the Ideal Toy Company created the board game titled The Diners' Club Credit Card Game.

In 1967, the film How to Succeed in Business Without Really Trying was released, incorporating the song Brotherhood of Man including the lyrics, "And other men may carry cards, as members of the Diners".

The Australian band Client Liaison feature Diners Club cards and logos in several of their retro-themed music videos.

See also

 Diners Club Arena
 Hyundai Card
 American Express
 Rupay
 Mastercard
 Visa

References

External links

Diners Club International
Diners Club USA
Diners Club Canada
Discover gets antitrust OK for Diners Club buy, Reuters

Discover Financial
Credit cards
Credit card issuer associations
Payment cards
Financial services companies established in 1950
1950 establishments in Illinois
Riverwoods, Illinois
Companies based in Lake County, Illinois
Citigroup
1981 mergers and acquisitions
2008 mergers and acquisitions
Credit cards in the United States
Dining clubs